Christen Andreas Fonnesbech (7 July 1817 – 17 May 1880) was a Danish lawyer, landowner and politician. He was Council President of Denmark from 1874 to 1875.

Biography
Fonnesbech was born in Copenhagen, where his father was a dressmaker. He became a student in 1835 and earned a cand.jur. degree from the University of Copenhagen in 1840. He began his tenure and became city clerk in Hillerød.
In 1843 he bought the estate Vesterbygård at Holbæk on Zealand.  In 1863 he acted as president of the County Council in Odense. Fonnesbech was also a member of the Folketing from 1858 to 1875.

He became a Knight of the Order of the Dannebrog in 1860, Commander of the 1st Degree in 1866, received the Grand Cross in 1870, was awarded the Cross of Honour (Dannebrogsmand) in 1871, and received the Medal of Merit in Gold in 1874. In 1863, he became Knight of the Order of the Polar Star.

References

1817 births
1880 deaths
Danish Finance Ministers
Danish Interior Ministers
Danish Kultus Ministers
Prime Ministers of Denmark
Members of the Folketing
Members of the Landsting (Denmark)
Politicians from Copenhagen
19th-century Danish politicians
Members of the Rigsrådet (1855-1866)
University of Copenhagen alumni